State Route 224 (SR 224) is a  north-south state highway that is located almost entirely in McNairy County, Tennessee, connecting Michie with Enville via Stantonville and Adamsville.

Route description

SR 224 begins in McNairy County in downtown Michie at an intersection with SR 22. It heads north along Michie Pebble Hill Road to have an intersection with SR 57 before leaving Michie and passing through some wooded areas. The highway then enters farmland shortly before entering Stantonville, where it has a short concurrency with SR 142. SR 224 the leaves Stantonville along Gilchrist Stantonville Road to pass through farmland before making a sharp left turn at an intersection with Gilchrist Road to come to an intersection with US 64/SR 15, which it becomes concurrent with. They head northeast to the extreme western edge of the Adamsville city limits, where SR 224 splits off along Leapwood Enville Road to go northwest, then north through farmland. It then enters wooded areas and passes through Leapwood, where it has an intersection with SR 199. The highway continues to wind its way north through a mix of farmland and wooded areas to enter Enville just shortly before crossing into Chester County. SR 224 then comes to an end at an intersection with SR 22A in downtown. Excluding the concurrency with US 64/SR 15, the entire route of SR 224 is a two-lane highway

Major intersections

References

224
Transportation in McNairy County, Tennessee
Transportation in Chester County, Tennessee